Gustavus Hamilton, 1st Viscount Boyne PC (Ire) (1642–1723) was an Irish soldier and politician. In his youth, he fought in his cousin Sir George Hamilton's regiment for the French in the Franco-Dutch War. About 1678 he obtained a commission in the Irish Army. King James II appointed him to his Irish Privy Council in 1685.

During the Williamite War Hamilton fought for the Prince of Orange defending Coleraine in 1689, fighting at the Boyne in 1690, fording the Shannon at the Siege of Athlone in June 1691, and fighting at Aughrim in July. King George I ennobled him in 1715.

This Gustavus Hamilton, Viscount, must not be confused with Gustavus Hamilton, governor of Enniskillen.

Birth and origins 

Gustavus was born in 1642, probably at Manorhamilton Castle, County Leitrim, Ireland, built by his father. He was the third son of Frederick Hamilton and Sidney Vaughan. His father was the fifth and youngest son of Claud Hamilton, 1st Lord Paisley, Scotland, and brother of James Hamilton, 1st Earl of Abercorn.

Gustavus's mother was the only child and heiress of Sir John Vaughan, who had been governor of Derry. Her family was of Welsh origin.

Gustavus was named for the Swedish king Gustavus Adolphus for whom his father had fought during the Thirty Years' War in Germany. Gustavus had two brothers and one sister, who are listed in his father's article.

Early life and Franco-Dutch War 
Hamilton's father died in 1647 in Scotland when Hamilton was about five years old. Hamilton immatriculated at Trinity College, Dublin in 1661 but seems to have abandoned his studies without obtaining a degree. In 1672 he went to France and became a captain in the regiment of Sir George Hamilton, his cousin once removed, the son of Sir George Hamilton, 1st Baronet, of Donalong, his cousin-german (see family tree). The regiment fought for Louis XIV against the Holy Roman Empire in the Franco-Dutch War (1672–1678) on the upper Rhine in the battles of Sinsheim and Entzheim in 1674, as well as the battles of Turckheim, Sasbach, and Altenheim in 1675. When Sir George was killed in action at the Col de Saverne in 1676, Hamilton left and returned to Ireland.

Marriage and children 
Hamilton married before 1686. His bride was Elizabeth Brooke, second daughter of Sir Henry Brooke, but eldest daughter by his second wife, Anne St George. Brooke was knight of Brookeborough, County Fermanagh, and governor of Donegal Castle but had died in 1671.

 
Gustavus and Elizabeth had three sons:
Frederick (died 1715), married in 1707; predeceased his father, but his son became the 2nd Viscount.
Gustavus of Red Wood, King's County (died 1734), MP for Donegal
Henry (1692–1743), MP for Donegal

—and a daughter:
Elizabeth, married Charles Lambart

Pre-war in Ireland 
In 1677 Hamilton accompanied James Butler, 1st Duke of Ormond, to Oxford where he was awarded the degree of a Doctor of Civil Law by the University of Oxford. By 1678 he was a captain in the Irish Army.

Hamilton was appointed to the Privy Council of Ireland on the accession of King James II of England in 1685.

In 1688 Hamilton was a major in William Stewart, 1st Viscount Mountjoy's regiment in Derry. On 23 November Tyrconnell ordered Mountjoy to march to Dublin for embarking to England.

Mountjoy appointed Robert Lundy governor of the town.

Williamite War 
At the Glorious Revolution, Hamilton declared for William of Orange.

In 1689 when Richard Hamilton attacked the Protestants in the north of Ireland, Hamilton organised the defence of Coleraine, which Richard Hamilton reached on 27 March. and resisted five weeks before retreating to Derry.

James called a parliament, known as the Patriot Parliament, which met on 7 May 1689. Hamilton's was one of the 2,470 names on a bill of attainder passed by the parliament. On 18 July the parliament was prorogued. In August Schomberg landed a Bangor. Among the troops he brought was the xx Regiment.

He commanded a regiment at the Battle of the Boyne on 1 July 1690, when his horse was shot under him and he almost killed.

In June 1691 he fought at the Siege of Athlone under Ginkel where on 30 June Gustavus took part in the daring attack over a ford on the River Shannon that captured the town. In this attack he commanded the cavalry together with General Thomas Tollemache while the infantry was commanded by Mackay, Tettau, Monceau de la Melonière and the Prince of Hesse.

In July he fought at the Battle of Aughrim. Ginkel organised his army into 4 divisions numbered from the north to the south and in two lines. Gustavus with his regiment was in the front line of the second division, i.e. a centre-right position.

Vice-admiral of Ulster 
In 1691 Hamilton was appointed Vice-Admiral of Ulster, an honorary position, which he held until 1710 when he passed it on to his son Frederick. It reverted to him on Frederick's untimely death on 10 December 1715. He, therefore, was Vice-Admiral of Ulster again from 1716 until his death in 1723.

First term as MP 
During the 1st Irish Parliament of King William III and Queen Mary (5 October 1692 – 26 June 1693) Hamilton was, on 22 September 1692,  elected as one of the two MPs for Donegal County. He gave Rosguill, County Donegal, as his residence.

Second term as MP 
Hamilton was reelected to his seat for Donegal at the general election for the 2nd Irish Parliament of King William III (27 August 1695 to 14 June 1699).

Third term as MP 
Hamilton was reelected to his seat for Donegal at the general election for the 1st Irish Parliament of Queen Anne (21 September 1703 to 6 May 1713).

Fourth term as MP 
Hamilton was reelected to one of the two seats for Strabane Borough at the general election for the 2nd Irish Parliament of Queen Anne (25 November 1713 to 1 August 1714).

Military career 
Hamilton was promoted brigadier-general in 1696 and major-general in 1704. In 1706 he resigned from his regiment and was replaced by Lieutenant-Colonel John Newton.

In May 1710, Hamilton was appointed to the Privy Council of Ireland for Queen Anne.

He bought land near Slane in County Meath from the Osborne family and about 1715 built Stackallan House (also spelt Stackallen).

In 1714, at the accession of King George I, Hamilton was kept on the new Irish privy council. In 1715 he was elevated to the Peerage of Ireland as Baron Hamilton of Stackallan, in the County of Meath by King George I. On 20 August 1717, Hamilton was further honoured by the King, when he was created Viscount Boyne, in the Province of Leinster, also in the Irish Peerage. In 1719 he participated in the Capture of Vigo.

His wife died in 1721.

Death, succession, and timeline 
Lord Boyne died on 16 September 1723  and was buried in the church of Stackallan. His eldest son, Frederick, having predeceased him in 1715, Boyne was succeeded by his grandson Gustavus as the 2nd Viscount Boyne.

See also 
List of parliaments of Ireland

Notes and references

Notes

Citations

Sources 
Subject matter monographs:
Click here. Henderson 1890 in Dictionary of National Biography
Click here. Murtagh 2004 in Oxford Dictionary of National Biography
Click here. Murtagh 2009 in Dictionary of Irish Biography
Click here. Webb 1878 in Compendium of Irish Biography
Click here. Wills 1841 in Lives of illustrious and distinguished Irishmen

 
 
 
 
  – Leinster (continued: Carlow, Kildare, Queen's County, King's County, Meath, Westmeath, Longford, Louth) & Munster
  (for Boyne)
 
  – Ab-Adam to Basing (for Family Tree)
  – Bass to Canning – Bass to Canning (for Boyne)
  – 1675 to 1676
  – Scotland and Ireland
 }
  – (Snippet view)
  – (for timeline)
 
 
 
 
  – G to Z
  – Earls (for Clanbrassil)
  – Viscounts (for Boyne)
  – Viscounts, barons
 
 
  – Abercorn to Balmerino
 
 
 
 

 

 

1642 births
1723 deaths
Alumni of Trinity College Dublin
English army officers
Hamilton, Gustavus
Hamilton, Gustavus
Hamilton, Gustavus
Hamilton, Gustavus
Lancashire Fusiliers officers
Members of the Parliament of Ireland (pre-1801) for County Donegal constituencies
Members of the Parliament of Ireland (pre-1801) for County Tyrone constituencies
Members of the Privy Council of England
Members of the Privy Council of Ireland
Peers of Ireland created by George I
Viscounts in the Peerage of Ireland
Hamilton